Petra Hamman (born 1946) is an American bridge player. She was born in Germany but is now from Dallas, Texas.

Bridge accomplishments

Awards

 Mott-Smith Trophy (1) 1999

Wins

 North American Bridge Championships (10)
 Wernher Open Pairs (1) 2007 
 Freeman Mixed Board-a-Match (2) 2011, 2013 
 Grand National Teams (1) 2006 
 Machlin Women's Swiss Teams (1) 1999 
 Sternberg Women's Board-a-Match Teams (3) 1989, 1998, 2000 
 Chicago Mixed Board-a-Match (2) 2003, 2005

Runners-up

 North American Bridge Championships (3)
 Silodor Open Pairs (1) 1999 
 Machlin Women's Swiss Teams (1) 1992 
 Wagar Women's Knockout Teams (1) 2000

Notes

Living people
American contract bridge players
1946 births
Date of birth missing (living people)
Place of birth missing (living people)
German emigrants to the United States
People from Dallas